The 1985 NCAA Division I men's basketball tournament involved 64 schools playing in single-elimination play to determine the national champion of men's  NCAA Division I college basketball. This was the first year the field was expanded to 64 teams, from 53 in the previous year's tournament. It began on March 14, 1985, and ended with the championship game on April 1 in Lexington, Kentucky. A total of 63 games were played.

Eighth-seed Villanova, coached by Rollie Massimino, won their first national title with a 66–64 victory in the final game over Georgetown, coached by John Thompson. Ed Pinckney of Villanova was named the tournament's Most Outstanding Player. The game, often cited as "The Perfect Game", is widely considered among the greatest upsets in college basketball history, and is the second biggest point-spread upset in Championship Game history. This Villanova team remains the lowest-seeded team to win the tournament. The Wildcats are also notable as the last Division I men's national champion to date to represent a school that did not sponsor varsity football at the time of its title (Villanova had dropped football after the 1980 season and did not reinstate the sport until the 1985 season, the first after the championship game). The game is also notable as the last played without a shot clock.

This year's Final Four saw an unprecedented and unmatched three teams from the same conference, with Big East members Villanova and Georgetown joined by St. John's. The only "interloper" in the Big East party was Memphis State, then of the Metro Conference (Memphis State's 1985 Final Four appearance was vacated due to using ineligible players, as were all of its tournament appearances from 1982–1986). Lehigh, champion of the East Coast Conference Tournament, became the first team in NCAA Tournament history to compete with a record below .500, as they were 12–18 at the time they played in the First Round.

This was also the first year that one of the regionals was named "Southeast", replacing "Mideast". This name was used until 1998, when the regional was renamed "South." This was also the last tournament until 2010 to feature two private schools in the title game. This tournament was also the last until 2012 to feature no teams in the Sweet 16 from the Mountain or Pacific Time Zones.

This tournament's East Region is the only one in NCAA Tournament history in which the higher-seeded team won every game.

Schedule and venues

The following are the sites that were selected to host each round of the 1985 tournament:

First and Second Rounds
March 14 and 16
East Region
 Hartford Civic Center, Hartford, Connecticut (Host: University of Connecticut)
Midwest Region
 Mabee Center, Tulsa, Oklahoma (Host: Oral Roberts University)
Southeast Region
 Athletic & Convocation Center, South Bend, Indiana (Host: University of Notre Dame)
West Region
 Special Events Center, Salt Lake City, Utah (Host: University of Utah)
March 15 and 17
East Region
 Omni Coliseum, Atlanta, Georgia (Host: Georgia Institute of Technology)
Midwest Region
 Hofheinz Pavilion, Houston, Texas (Host: University of Houston)
Southeast Region
 University of Dayton Arena, Dayton, Ohio (Host: University of Dayton)
West Region
 University Arena ("The Pit"), Albuquerque, New Mexico (Host: University of New Mexico)

Regional semifinals and finals (Sweet Sixteen and Elite Eight)
March 21 and 23
East Regional, Providence Civic Center, Providence, Rhode Island (Host: Providence College)
Midwest Regional, Reunion Arena, Dallas, Texas (Host: Southwest Conference)
March 22 and 24
Southeast Regional, BJCC Coliseum, Birmingham, Alabama (Host: Southeastern Conference)
West Regional, McNichols Sports Arena, Denver, Colorado (Host: Big 8 Conference)

National semifinals and championship (Final Four and championship)
March 30 and April 1
Rupp Arena, Lexington, Kentucky (Host: University of Kentucky)

Lexington became the 21st host city, and Rupp Arena the 23rd host venue, for the Final Four. Lexington is the smallest metropolitan area to host a Final Four, and due to the use of domed football stadiums, it is unlikely to host a Final Four again despite the size of Rupp Arena.  The 1985 tournament was the last time an off-campus arena (or, for that matter, any arena) whose primary tenant was a college team was used for a tournament. (The Continental Airlines Arena (in 1996) was the main arena for Seton Hall, but they were not the primary tenants.) This tournament also marks the last time a domed stadium was not used for any tournament games; before 1985, the four previous tournaments and the 1971 tournament were the only tournaments to include them. The other implication of this is that it was the only tournament between 1984 and 1993 to not feature an NFL stadium. Denver was the only new city or venue host games in 1985. At the time, the city did not host an NCAA Division I institution, making it just one of a handful of host cities all-time to do so. 1985 would be the last time the Providence Civic Center would host the regional rounds; all subsequent tournaments would be early rounds. The tournament would also mark the last time the University of Tulsa's Mabee Center would host games; the tournament would not return to the city until 2011, when the BOK Center hosted.

Teams

Bracket
* – Denotes overtime period

East Regional – Providence, Rhode Island

Regional Final Summary

West Regional – Denver, Colorado

First round Summary

Second Round Summary

Regional semifinal Summary

Regional Final Summary

Southeast Regional – Birmingham, Alabama

Regional Final Summary

Midwest Regional – Dallas, Texas

Regional Final Summary

Final Four – Lexington, Kentucky

Game Summaries

National Championship

Announcers

Television
CBS Sports
Brent Musburger First round (Kentucky–Washington), (Arizona–Alabama), second round & Dick Stockton Regional, Final Four served as studio hosts and Bill Raftery Regional, Final Four served as studio analyst.
Dick Stockton/Brent Musburger and Billy Packer – Stockton/Packer, first round (Kentucky–Washington), second round at Salt Lake City, Utah & Houston, Texas; Musburger/Packer, East Regionals at Providence, Rhode Island, Southeast Regional Finals at Birmingham, Alabama, Final Four at Lexington, Kentucky
Gary Bender and Doug Collins – Second Round at South Bend, Indiana & Dayton, Ohio, West Regionals at Denver, Colorado
Frank Glieber and James Brown – Second Round at Hartford, Connecticut, Midwest Regionals at Dallas, Texas
Pat Summerall/Verne Lundquist and Larry Conley – Summerall/Conley, second round at Atlanta, Georgia; Lundquist/Conley, Southeast Regional semifinals (Auburn–North Carolina) at Birmingham, Alabama
Verne Lundquist and Steve Grote – First round (Arizona–Alabama) & Second Round at Albuquerque, New Mexico
Tim Ryan and Bill Raftery – Second Round at Tulsa, Oklahoma
ESPN and NCAA Productions
Bob Ley (NCAA Tournament Today/NCAA Tournament Tonight) served as studio host and Dick Vitale served as studio analyst.
 – First round (Lehigh–Georgetown) & (Old Dominion–SMU) at Hartford, Connecticut
 – First round (Virginia Tech–Temple) & (Iona–Loyola-Chicago) at Hartford, Connecticut
 Mike Patrick and Larry Conley – First round (Northeastern–Illinois) & (Mercer–Georgia Tech) at Atlanta, Georgia
 – First round (Wichita State–Georgia) & (DePaul–Syracuse) at Atlanta, Georgia
 – First round (Iowa State–Ohio State) & (Illinois State–Southern California) at Tulsa, Oklahoma
 – First round (Pittsburgh–Louisiana Tech) & (North Carolina A&T–Oklahoma) at Tulsa, Oklahoma
 – First round (Penn–Memphis State) & (Pepperdine–Duke) at Houston, Texas
 – First round (Michigan State–UAB) & (Boston College–Texas Tech) at Houston, Texas
 – First round (Navy–Louisiana State) & (Dayton–Villanova) at Dayton, Ohio
 Frank Herzog/Ralph Hacker and Joe Dean– First round (Miami (OH)–Maryland) & (Fairleigh Dickinson–Michigan) at Dayton, Ohio
 – First round (Ohio–Kansas) & (Oregon State–Notre Dame) at South Bend, Indiana
 Tom Hammond and Jack Givens – First round (Auburn–Purdue) & (Middle Tennessee–North Carolina) at South Bend, Indiana
 – First round (Southern–St. John's) at Salt Lake City, Utah
 – First round (Arkansas–Iowa) & (San Diego State–UNLV) at Salt Lake City, Utah
 Larry Zimmer and Ted Owens – First round (Nevada–NC State) at Albuquerque, New Mexico
 – First round (UTEP–Tulsa) & (Marshall–VCU) at Albuquerque, New Mexico
 Frank Fallon and Gary Thompson- Midwest Regional semifinals (Louisiana Tech–Oklahoma) at Dallas, Texas
 Mike Patrick and Larry Conley – Southeast Regional semifinals (Villanova–Maryland) at Birmingham, Alabama

Radio

Regionals
CBS Radio
 – East Regionals at Providence, Rhode Island
 – Midwest Regionals at Dallas, Texas
 – Southeast Regionals at Birmingham, Alabama
 – West Regionals at Denver, Colorado

Final four
 – at Lexington, Kentucky

Further reading

See also
 1985 NCAA Division II men's basketball tournament
 1985 NCAA Division III men's basketball tournament
 1985 NCAA Division I women's basketball tournament
 1985 NCAA Division II women's basketball tournament
 1985 NCAA Division III women's basketball tournament
 1985 National Invitation Tournament
 1985 National Women's Invitation Tournament
 1985 NAIA Division I men's basketball tournament
 1985 NAIA Division I women's basketball tournament

References

NCAA Division I men's basketball tournament
Ncaa
NCAA Division I men's basketball tournament
NCAA Division I men's basketball tournament
NCAA Division I men's basketball tournament
Basketball in the Dallas–Fort Worth metroplex
Basketball in Houston